is a Japanese manga series written by Masafumi Nishida and Tadayoshi Kubo and illustrated by Kouta Sannomiya. It was serialized in Kodansha's Weekly Shōnen Magazine from January to July 2021, and it was transferred to Magazine Pocket in August 2021. An anime television series adaptation produced by Gambit aired from October to December 2021.

Characters

 /

Media

Manga
Tesla Note, written by Masafumi Nishida and Tadayoshi Kubo and illustrated by Kouta Sannomiya, was serialized in Kodansha's Weekly Shōnen Magazine from January 6 to July 7, 2021. The manga was then transferred to Magazine Pocket on August 4, 2021, and finished on April 13, 2022. Kodansha collected its 58 individual chapters into seven tankōbon volumes, released between April 16, 2021 and June 17, 2022.

The manga is licensed in English by Kodansha USA in digital form.

Volume list

Anime
In April 2021, it was announced that the series will receive an anime television series adaptation. The series is animated by Gambit and directed by Michio Fukuda, with Masafumi Nishida overseeing the series' scripts, POKImari designing the characters, and Kaoru Wada composing the series' music. It aired from October 3 to December 26, 2021 on Tokyo MX and BS11. TOKYO MONSTERS performed the opening theme "PUPPET'S", while Yui Ninomiya performed the ending theme "Sanbunteki Life". Funimation licensed the series outside of Asia.

Episode list

Notes

References

External links
 
 

Action anime and manga
Anime series based on manga
Espionage in anime and manga
Funimation
Japanese webcomics
Kodansha manga
Shōnen manga
Tokyo MX original programming
Webcomics in print